À l'ami qui ne m'a pas sauvé la vie (English: "To the friend who did not save my life") is a novel by Hervé Guibert first published by Gallimard in 1990. It is a frank portrayal of the physical and psychological suffering caused by AIDS. The book is considered to be a work of autofiction as although it clearly mimics the last years of Guibert's own life, names are changed and it makes no claims to be truthful to real events.

It won the Prix Colette prize in 1990.

The publication of the novel landed Guibert an important television interview on the show Apostrophes on which he discussed AIDS and his novel. By 1994, 400,000 copies of the novel were sold. Guibert wrote two sequels: Le Protocole Compassionel and L'homme au chapeau rouge.

Overview

The story begins by building towards the first person protagonist's discovery that he has AIDS; once he knows this he monitors his progress, including his physical decline in the grip of the disease, often with great precision (for example, he frequently notes his exact T-cell count). The "friend who (does) not save his life" is an American named Bill who tells him that he knows of a scientist who has found a cure for the disease and can get him in the test group. The friend, as implied by the title, lets him down.

The protagonist talks about at least two prominent friends in the book, not least 'Muzil' (who represents Michel Foucault) who also suffers and dies from AIDS. Isabelle Adjani is also recognisable in the character of 'Marine'.

Bibliography

À l'ami qui ne m'a pas sauvé la vie, Hervé Guibert, Gallimard, 1990, 
To the Friend Who Did Not Save My Life: A Novel by Hervé Guibert, tr. Linda Coverdale, Quartet, November 1991,

References

1990 French novels
1990s LGBT novels
French autobiographical novels
Novels about HIV/AIDS
French LGBT novels
Novels set in Paris
Novels with gay themes
Autofiction